Muyocopron is a genus of fungi in the Muyocopronaceae family.

Species
As accepted by Species Fungorum;

 Muyocopron affine 
 Muyocopron alcornii 
 Muyocopron argentinense 
 Muyocopron atromaculans 
 Muyocopron bakerianum 
 Muyocopron calamagrostidis 
 Muyocopron carissae 
 Muyocopron caseariae 
 Muyocopron cassiicola 
 Muyocopron castanopsidis 
 Muyocopron celtidis 
 Muyocopron chromolaenae 
 Muyocopron chromolaenicola 
 Muyocopron cinnamomi 
 Muyocopron coloratum 
 Muyocopron conjunctum 
 Muyocopron corrientinum 
 Muyocopron crustaceum 
 Muyocopron cucurbitacearum 
 Muyocopron dipterocarpi 
 Muyocopron eleocharidis 
 Muyocopron fagifolii 
 Muyocopron ficinum 
 Muyocopron freycinetiae 
 Muyocopron freycineticola 
 Muyocopron garethjonesii 
 Muyocopron geniculatum 
 Muyocopron guiscatrei 
 Muyocopron heveae 
 Muyocopron hongkongense 
 Muyocopron indicum 
 Muyocopron laterale 
 Muyocopron lithocarpi 
 Muyocopron litorale 
 Muyocopron manihoticola 
 Muyocopron millepunctatum 
 Muyocopron mucoris 
 Muyocopron neyveliensis 
 Muyocopron ovatisporum 
 Muyocopron palmarum 
 Muyocopron pandani 
 Muyocopron parviflorae 
 Muyocopron ramicola 
 Muyocopron sahnii 
 Muyocopron smilacis 
 Muyocopron smilaciscaule 
 Muyocopron stigmatostalycis 
 Muyocopron taiwanense 
 Muyocopron tectum 
 Muyocopron thailandicum 
 Muyocopron umbilicatum 
 Muyocopron vaccinii 
 Muyocopron valdivianum 
 Muyocopron vanillae 
 Muyocopron yerbae 
 Muyocopron zamiae 

Former species;
 M. baccarum  = Microthyrium baccarum, Microthyriaceae
 M. denudans  = Stegothyrium denudans, Microthyriaceae
 M. euryae  = Phyllachora euryae, Phyllachoraceae
 M. fecundum  = Dictyothyrina fecunda, Micropeltidaceae
 M. fecundum var. atrocyaneum  = Dictyothyrina atrocyanea, Micropeltidaceae
 M. flageoletianum  = Nitschkia flageoletiana, Nitschkiaceae
 M. granulatum  = Trabutia granulata, Phyllachoraceae
 M. hederae  = Microthyrium hederae, Microthyriaceae
 M. ilicinum  = Microthyrium ilicinum, Microthyriaceae
 M. ramulare  = Microdothella ramularis, Dothideomycetes
 M. umbilicatum var. rubi  = Muyocopron umbilicatum, Muyocopronaceae

References

Dothideomycetes genera
Taxa described in 1881